The TVR Griffith 200 (or Griffith Series 200) was a lightweight fibreglass-body sports car. In the United States, the make was Griffith and the model was Griffith Series 200, whilst the United Kingdom the make was TVR and the model was Griffith 200.

Origin
Jack Griffith came up with the idea for the car in 1964, and secured rights to market the cars in the US. Griffith ran a car repair workshop in the US for patrons such as Gerry Sagerman and Mark Donohue who had both driven a TVR Grantura at Sebring International Raceway in 1962. The concept for the Griffith Series 200 originated during a dinner with Carroll Shelby, where Griffith declared he could build a car that could outperform an AC Cobra.

Griffith first attempt was to put the Ford V8 engine from Mark Donohue's AC Cobra into a TVR Grantura. While this did not work, the idea prompted further conversations. Griffith wanted TVR to supply him with modified TVR Grantura chassis, without an engine or transmission, and TVR complied with his request.

In an effort to get the engine and gearbox to fit, some chassis triangulation was removed compared to that of the Grantura Mk 3, and various parts of the chassis were simply hammered until the drivetrain fitted. The brakes were not upgraded either, although slightly wider 185 section tyres were added.

Production

The Griffith Series 200 could either be fitted with a  motor, or a  motor that put out . It could accelerate from 0-60 mph (97 km/h) in 3.9 seconds, and had a  top speed.

The British motoring journalist and former racing driver John Bolster reported that he had tested a Griffith from 0-60 (97 km/h) in 5.2 seconds and covered the standing quarter-mile in 13.8 seconds. Top speed was 163 mph (262 km/h). Bolster wrote that "over 150 mph (242 km/h), things become somewhat fraught. One must either choose a still day or risk becoming one of Those Magnificent Men in Their Flying Machines." This Griffith had the 271 hp engine with three twin-choke Holley carburetters. Bolster believed the engine developed at least 285 bhp at about 6500 rpm.

The immense power, short wheelbase, and light weight of the cars allegedly made them difficult to handle. Despite its performance, just 192 Griffith 200s were made in the US, before it was superseded by the TVR Griffith 400 (Griffith Series 400).

Legacy
The Griffith Series 200 was followed by the Griffith Series 400 and the Griffith Series 600 before the company ceased operations. In the early 1990s TVR paid homage to the original Griffith by introducing the TVR Griffith. This was the first true use of the name "TVR Griffith".

References

External links
 First ever authorized biography of Andrew "Jack" Griffith as told by Jack Griffith to Matt Boyd
 Hemming Muscle Machines, May 2011 bio on Jack Griffith "Hot Rod Hero" by Dan Strohl and David LaChance
 Griffith Series 200 model by Automodello in 1/43 scale
 Complete history of the Griffith
 Another Griffith 200 page

Griffith 200
Sports cars